Arapoema is a municipality located in the Brazilian state of Tocantins. Its population is 6,616 (2020) and its area is 1,552 km².

References

Municipalities in Tocantins